Mozac Samson (born 1 September 1986) is a Fijian born Canadian professional rugby union player. He plays as a centre for the Seattle Seawolves in Major League Rugby previously playing for Canada internationally.

References

Prairie Wolf Pack players
Seattle Seawolves players
Rugby union centres
Rugby union wings
1986 births
Living people